Fantasmas (Ghosts) It is the second studio album by Willie Colón, released in 1981 by Fania Records. The album was very experimental, experimenting with sounds and rhythms like Zamba, La Plena, La Bomba. And among all those styles songs like "Oh, Qué Será?", "Celo", "Amor Verdadero" among others stand out. The album was released in 1981 during the Romantic Salsa period and gave him a musical vehicle to explore his new interests.

Tracklisting
The song list have been adapted from AllMusic.

Personnel
 Willie Colón: Synthesizer, Chorus Ensemble, Top Producer, Mixing, Lead Vocals
 Jon Fausty: Engineer, Mixing
 Jerry Masucci: Executive Producer
 Fabian Ross: Associate Producer
 Leopoldo Pineda: Assistant Producer, Trombone
 Jorge Calandrelli: Piano, Arranger (Al Dormir & Sueño de Papelote)
 Lewis Kahn: Trombone
 Sam Burtis: Trombone
 Yomo Toro: Cuatro
 Salvador Cuevas: Bass
 Paul Kimbarrow: Drums
 Hector Garrido: Vocal Arrangements, Arranger (Amor Verdadero, Oh Que Sera & Mi Sueño)
 Marty Sheller: Arranger (Volar a Puerto Rico & Celo)
 Ruben Blades: Chorus Ensemble
 Jose Torres: Piano
 Jose Mangual: Bongo, Maracas, Guiro, Guira, Chorus Ensemble
 Milton Cardona: Tumba, Quinto, Chequere, Surdo, Claves, Chorus Ensemble
 Johnny Almendra: Timbal
 Harold Kohon: Strings
 Luis Cruz: Arranger (Toma Mis Manos)
 Damaris Cortez: Chorus Ensemble (Toma Mis Manos, Amor Verdadero, Oh Que Sera, Volar A Puerto Rico)
 Doris Eugenio: Chorus Ensemble (Mi Sueño, Toma Mis Manos, Amor Verdadero, Oh Que Sera, Volar A Puerto Rico)
 Yvonne: Chorus Ensemble (Amor Verdadero, Oh Que Sera, Volar A Puerto Rico)
 Encarnacion Perez: Chorus Ensemble (Mi Sueño)
 Sandy Mangual: Chorus Ensemble (Mi Sueño)
 Nancy O'Neil: Chorus Ensemble (Mi Sueño)
 Frank Kolleogy: Photography
 Terry Borges: Art Direction
 Ron Levine: Album Design
Recorded at La Tierra Studios / Mixed at Latin Sound Studios.

See also
 Willie Colón discography

References

1981 albums
Willie Colón albums